Gordon Burn (16 January 1948 – 17 July 2009) was an English writer born in Newcastle upon Tyne and the author of four novels and several works of non-fiction.

Background
Burn's novels deal with issues of modern fame and faded celebrity as lived through the media spotlight. His novel Alma Cogan (1991), which imagined the future life of the British singer Alma Cogan had she not died in 1966, won the Whitbread Award for Best First Novel. His other novels, Fullalove and The North of England Home Service, appeared in 1995 and 2003, respectively.

His non-fiction deals primarily with sport and true crime. His first book, Somebody's Husband, Somebody's Son, was a study of Peter Sutcliffe, 'the Yorkshire Ripper,' and his 1998 book, Happy Like Murderers: The Story of Fred and Rosemary West, dealt in similar detail with two of Britain's most notorious serial killers.

Burn's interest in such infamous villains extended to his fiction, with Myra Hindley, one of the 'Moors murderers', featuring prominently in the novel Alma Cogan. His sport-based books are Pocket Money: Inside the World of Snooker (1986) and Best and Edwards: Football, Fame and Oblivion (2006), which deals with the twin stories of Manchester United footballers Duncan Edwards and George Best, and the "trajectory of two careers unmoored in wildly different ways."

He also wrote a book with British artist Damien Hirst, On the Way to Work, a collection of interviews from various dates between 1992 and 2001. He contributed to The Guardian regularly, usually writing about contemporary art.

Gordon Burn died of bowel cancer in 2009, aged 61.

Sex & Violence, Death & Silence
Sex & Violence, Death & Silence is a 2009 book written by Gordon Burn and published by Faber and Faber. It contains selections of writing by Burn about art and artists (as well as art dealers and collectors) spanning almost thirty-five years, including interviews and reviews as well as extracts from his novel Alma Cogan.  It opens with a foreword by Damien Hirst with David Peace.

Gordon Burn died in the summer of 2009, whilst the book was being prepared for publication.

The list of artists discussed in the book is as follows:

Art dealer Nigel Greenwood is also discussed.

Critical reception
Nicholas Lezard described the work as being "knowledgeable, thorough and readable".

Bibliography

Fiction
Alma Cogan (1991)
Fullalove (1995)
The North of England Home Service (2003)
Born Yesterday: The News As A Novel (2008)

Non-fiction
Somebody's Husband, Somebody's Son: The Story of Peter Sutcliffe (1984)
Pocket Money: Inside The World of Snooker (1986)
Happy Like Murderers: The Story of Fred And Rosemary West (1998)
On The Way To Work (with Damien Hirst) (2001)
Best And Edwards: Football, Fame And Oblivion (2006)

Gordon Burn Prize 
In 2013 the Gordon Burn Prize was launched "to reward fiction or non-fiction written in the English language, which in the opinion of the judges most successfully represents the spirit and sensibility of Gordon's literary methods: novels which dare to enter history and interrogate the past...literature which challenges perceived notions of genre and makes us think again about just what it is that we are reading."

The prize is a jointly organised by the Gordon Burn Trust, New Writing North and Faber & Faber. The winner receives £5,000 and is offered the use of Burn's cottage in Berwickshire as a writers' retreat. The prize ceremony is generally the first event of the Durham Book Festival.

Winners

References

1948 births
2009 deaths
English non-fiction crime writers
English male journalists
The Guardian journalists
Writers from Newcastle upon Tyne
Deaths from colorectal cancer
English male novelists
20th-century English novelists
21st-century English novelists
20th-century English male writers
21st-century English male writers
Deaths from cancer in England